Siegmund Salfeld (24 March 1843 – May 1926) was a German rabbi and writer. He was born at Stadthagen, Schaumburg-Lippe.

Having received his degree of Ph.D. from the University of Berlin in 1870, he became in the same year rabbi of Dessau, Anhalt. In 1880 he was chosen rabbi of Mainz. He collaborated on Meyers Konversations-Lexikon and the Jewish Encyclopedia. He died in Mainz, aged 83.

Works
Fünf Predigten (1879), sermons delivered on different occasions
Das Hohelied Salomo's bei den Jüdischen Erklärern des Mittelalters (Berlin, 1879)
Dr. Salomon Herxheimer (Frankfort-on-the-Main, 1885) biography
Nürnberg im Mittelalter (Kiel, 1894-1896) with M. Stern 
Der Alte Israelitische Friedhof in Mainz (Berlin, 1898)
Das Martyrologium des Nürnberger Memorbuches (ib. 1898), a work edited for the Gesellschaft für die Geschichte der Juden in Deutschland
Bilder aus der Vergangenheit der Jüdischen Gemeinde Mainz (Mayence, 1903)

References

Guide to the Papers of Siegmund Salfeld (1843-1926)

External links

 Digitized works by Siegmund Salfeld at the Leo Baeck Institute, New York

1843 births
1926 deaths
People from Stadthagen
19th-century German rabbis
People from Schaumburg-Lippe
German male writers
20th-century German rabbis